Joseph C. Goulden (born 1934) is an American writer and former political reporter.

Early life and family
Joseph Goulden was born in Marshall, Texas, in 1934. His father owned the Texian Book Store located on the southeast corner of the Harrison County Courthouse square in Marshall. Joseph learned to read at age four. He is a graduate of the University of Texas. His sons are Troy and Jimmy Goulden.

He married Leslie C. Smith, an attorney, in 1979.

Career
Goulden was a member of the U.S. Army, where he was trained in counter-intelligence. Later he entered journalism, working for The Dallas Morning News. At The Philadelphia Inquirer, he worked first as an investigative reporter and later as head of the Washington bureau. He became a freelance writer in 1968 and wrote for a  number of publications, including Harper's,  The Nation, The Washingtonian, and The Washington Times.

He was a member of the Virginia Military Institute's International Studies Advisory Board.

Selected publications

Authored
 The Curtis Caper 1965
 Monopoly 1968
 Truth is the First Casualty 1969
 The Money Givers 1971
 The Superlawyers 1972
 Meany 1972
 The Benchwarmers 1974
 The Best Years, 1945-1950 1976
 Korea: The Untold Story of the War. McGraw-Hill, New York, 1983. 
 The Dictionary of Espionage: Spyspeak into English. 1986. (Revised edition Dover Press, 2012.)

Edited
 Mencken's Last Campaign: H.L. Mencken on the 1948 Election. New Republic, Washington DC, 1976. (Introduction and editor)

References

External links

American political writers
American political journalists
Living people
1934 births
People from Marshall, Texas